The Neale Publishing Company was an American book publisher active between 1894 and 1933. It was a prolific publisher of books about the American Civil War and the Southern United States.

History 
The Neale Publishing Company was founded by Walter Neale in 1894. Neale, who had previously worked as a writer, established the company in Washington, D.C. and was one of only two employees.  Neale began publishing books in 1896. In 1899 the company published a journal, Conservative Review, but the periodical lasted only two years. It was enough, however, to kick-start the rest of Neale's publishing operation, and forty books were published between 1900 and 1901. 

Neale incorporated the company in March of 1901. It began to rapidly expand and in 1902 was officially listed in the Publishers Trade List Annual. Sometime in this period, writer Ambrose Bierce wrote a scathing review of one of Neale's publications that extended to the company itself. The book in question quickly sold 6,000 copies as a result of the review and Bierce and Neale became close friends shortly thereafter. The company would go on to publish nearly all of Bierce's future books.

From 1901 onwards, Neale became a prolific publisher books about the American Civil War and the Southern United States in general. Walter Neale was a openly racist and often criticized the policies of the Reconstruction era, however, he regularly published books critical of his own position. By 1910, the Neale Publishing Company had printed more books by Southern writers on the South than any other American publisher. The company offered its authors significant royalties for the time  20-to-25% of gross sales and 50% of income from republications  and heavily advertised its books, spending more than $50,000 in advertising in the first half of the company's existence.

In 1911 the company shut down its Washington, D.C. office and moved all operations to New York City. In 1912, Walter Neale was arrested after sending a threatening letter to one of his authors, Elizabeth Meriwether. Around this time, Neale ventured into publishing periodicals again, with the first issue of Neale's Monthly being published in January of 1913. Despite projecting profits in excess of $250,000, the journal only lasted eighteen months and it is unclear if it made any profit.

Beginning in 1915, the company began a gradual decline. It moved locations to a smaller and less expensive building, sold much of its back catalog at a significant discount, and stopped nearly all of its print advertising. In 1919, the company's bindery was destroyed in a fire. No new books were published between 1920 and 1927 as Walter Neale focused his attention on several other business ventures, including two other publishing companies and a supply company. Publications resumed in 1927, culminating in Neale publishing a book of his own in 1929: Life of Ambrose Bierce, a tribute to his friend who had disappeared in 1913. Neale died of heart disease in 1933 and, with his death, the company went defunct.

In 1977, Morningside Press published Neale Books: An Annotated Bibliography by Robert T. Krick, which documented all of the books Neale published over the course of its existence.

Noted books 

The Neale Publishing Company released at least 596 titles between 1894 and 1933. Of those, 215 were fiction, 279 were non-fiction, and 75 were poetry.
 Selected Poems of Henry Ames Blood (1901) by Henry Ames Blood
 A Memoir of Robert M. T. Hunter (1903) by Martha T. Hunter
 Haiti: Her History and Her Detractors (1907) by Jacques Nicolas Léger
 My Life and My Lectures (1908) by Lamar Fontaine
 The Devil's Dictionary (1911) by Ambrose Bierce
 The Facts of Reconstruction (1913) by John R. Lynch
 The Valley Campaigns (1914) by Thomas Ashby
 Recollections of a California Pioneer (1917) by Carlisle S. Abbott
 Below the James: A Plantation Sketch (1918) by William Cabell Bruce
 Life of Ambrose Bierce (1929) by Walter Neale

References

External links 

 The Neale Publishing Company at Wikisource

1894 establishments in the United States
1933 disestablishments in the United States
Publishing companies based in New York City
Publishing companies established in 1894
Publishing companies disestablished in 1933
Book publishing companies